Turkish-Islamic nationalism, commonly referred to as Turkish-Islamic synthesis, is a type of Muslim religious nationalism which mixes Turkish nationalism. It's often embraced by Idealists (Ülkücüler).

History  
Historian Gökhan Çetinsaya explained that there is three opinions on the topic of Turkish nationalism and Islam. First are the nationalists who reject Islam, second are Islamists who reject nationalism, and third are the ones who mix them both together. Turkish Islamonationalism was originally created by right-wing intellectuals who were concerned of increasing leftist influence in the country. They wanted to make a religion-inspired nationalism. İbrahim Kafesoğlu is seen as the founder of the ideology. According to the synthesis, you have to be a Muslim in order to be a Turk, and that Islam is the most suitable religion for Turks. In the late 1970s, the Turkish political scene was full of ideological conflicts between far-right ultranationalists (Idealists) and far-left groups, along with little-to-no governmental effort to stop it. Under the Motherland Party rule, Turkish Islamonationalism became the de facto official ideology of Turkey (and until today it is accused of being so under AKP rule, although the AKP strongly denies it). In 1982, religion was strengthened in schools and education as a way to strengthen Turkish Islamonationalism, which intended to weaken mainstream Islamism and secular nationalism.

Views on non-Turks

Arabs 
There were few cases of anti-Arabism among  Turkish Islamonationalists before the Syrian refugee crisis in Turkey. After the refugee crisis, anti-Arabism increased. In Gaziantep, approximately 2 dozen Syrian Arabs had to leave the city after angry Turkish crowds belonging to the Grey Wolves ransacked their homes. Another time a group of about 1,000 Grey Wolves, which organized on social media, blocked various roads in Kahramanmaraş and refused to leave even after police warnings. The protestors also removed Arabic signs from many Syrian-owned stores, and many store owners closed their shops in fear. They also attacked a Syrian in a car and broke his windows, however they ran away after the Turkish police fired a warning gunshot into the air. Many Turkish Islamonationalist organizations volunteer to fight in Syria in favor of Syrian Turkmen to strengthen Turkmen interests and weaken Arab rule. The Alperen Hearths sent 250 fighters in 2015 to "fight against Russia, Iran, and Assad. And to help Turkmen".

Kurds 
Although the Grey Wolves are known to be openly anti-Kurdish, most of the Turkish Islamonationalists and groups have stated that they do not hate ethnic Kurds, but only hate the PKK, HDP, YPG, separatist Kurds, and the idea of an independent Kurdistan. Some have also blamed secular-nationalism for being one of the causes of the Kurdish–Turkish conflict, stating that Islam was the only link between Kurds and Turks, and secular-nationalists, on both sides, destroyed it. 

After the CHP said that "a legitimate body is needed for the Kurdish problem, we can solve the issue with HDP", the MHP leader Devlet Bahçeli stated that "There is no Kurdish problem in Turkey. The CHP, IYI, and HDP see my Kurdish brothers as a problem". 

In an Iftar speech, Mustafa Destici, leader of the BBP, who previously ripped a picture of a Kurdistan map, said that "The Kurds are our brothers. Unfortunately, some political structures and groups within both of us either can't see the bigger picture, or it doesn't work for them to see it. They are chasing small calculations for the sake of political interest. The basis for Turkey's ability to continue on its way as a whole passes through unity."  In a 2021 speech, Destici said that the "HDP does not represent the Kurds, it represents the PKK and YPG".

Greeks 
Turkish Islamonationalists are known to hate Greeks due to their conflicts in history as well as Greeks being Christian. The Grey Wolves were once accused of storming an Istanbul pogrom memorial exhibition and throwing eggs and taking down pictures, although the Grey Wolves denied any involvement. In 2005 many  Turkish Islamonationalists organized a rally and marched to the gate of the Ecumenical Patriarchate of Constantinople and chanted "Patriarch Leave" and "Patriarchate to Greece". MHP leader also once held a map showing Turkey claiming all of the islands controlled by Greece.

Armenians 
Similar to Greeks, Turkish Islamonationalists are also known to hate Armenians due to their conflicting history and due to Armenians practicing Christianity. Sevag Balıkçı, an Armenian in the Turkish Army, was murdered by Kıvanç Ağaoglu, who was a supporter of Abdullah Çatlı, the former Grey Wolves leader. On Armenian Genocide Remembrance Day in 2012, various nationalist and Turkish Islamonationalist groups protested against the remembrance of the Armenian genocide in Taksim Square. When Armenian pianist Tigran Hamasyan visited the city of Ani in Kars Province, the local Grey Wolves leader suggested that his anyone who supports him should "go on an Armenian hunt."

Criticism 
Turkish Islamonationalism is often criticized by Islamists who view nationalism as a sin, by secular Turkish nationalists who view religion as unimportant, and by various minority rights organizations and activists in Turkey.

Islamic scholar Ihsan Senocak once said "Neither Turkish-Islamic nationalism, nor Kurdish-Islamic nationalism. Only Islam."

Notable Turkish Islamonationalists  

Ziya Gökalp
Alparslan Türkeş
Mustafa Destici
Devlet Bahçeli
Recep Tayyip Erdoğan

Turkish Islamonationalist Groups 
 Great Unity Party
 Nationalist Movement Party 
 Alperen Hearths
 Grey Wolves 
 Sultan Murad Division
 Justice and Development Party (Turkey)

See also 
 Nine Lights Doctrine
 Iranian Islamonationalism
 Kurdish Islamonationalism

References 

Islamic nationalism
Turkish nationalism 
Far-right politics in Turkey
Opposition to Arab nationalism
Syncretic political movements